Stellantis Italy, formerly known as Fiat Group Automobiles S.p.A. from 2007 to 2014 and FCA Italy S.p.A. from 2014 to 2021, is the Italian subsidiary of the multinational automaker Stellantis, dedicated to the production and selling of passenger cars and light commercial vehicles and headquartered in Turin, Italy.

History
In January 1979, Fiat S.p.A.'s automotive production activities were spun off into a new subsidiary, "Fiat Auto S.p.A.", as part of an ongoing decentralization process within Fiat. Vittorio Ghidella was named CEO.

"Fiat Group Automobiles S.p.A." was created on 1 February 2007 from Fiat Auto S.p.A.

Simultaneously, the four divisions of Fiat Auto (Fiat, Alfa Romeo, Lancia and Fiat Veicoli Commerciali) were made into four Società per azioni, all controlled 100 percent by Fiat Group Automobiles. The former brand directors became CEOs of the new societies, while the employees and production facilities remained under Fiat Group Automobiles.

At the same time the Abarth brand was relaunched as Abarth & C. S.p.A., a fifth independent society again owned 100 percent by Fiat Group Automobiles.

On December 15, 2014 Fiat Group Automobiles S.p.A. changed name to "FCA Italy S.p.A."; the name change was announced to the press the following day.

Maserati and Ferrari are not under the control of FCA Italy. Maserati is directly owned by Stellantis, whereas Ferrari split from FCA in 2015.

On January 16, 2021, the operations of Fiat Chrysler Automobiles and Groupe PSA were merged to form Stellantis and the company was renamed Stellantis Italy.

Main subsidiaries
 Abarth
 Alfa Romeo
 Fiat
Fiat Professional
 Lancia

References

External links
 

Italy
Vehicle manufacturing companies established in 2007
Italian companies established in 2007
Car manufacturers of Italy
Electric vehicle manufacturers of Italy
Turin motor companies